Bōken sekai (Japanese: Adventure World) was a boys' adventure magazine which was started during the late Meiji period in Japan. It was headquartered in Tokyo and existed between 1908 and 1920.

History and profile
Bōken sekai was established in 1908. In the first issue the magazine stated its objective as “to tell exciting stories from throughout the world that will not only inspire a spirit of daring, courage, and sincerity, but eliminate all those runts who are weak, corrupt, and decadent.” It was part of the Hakubunkan Publications and was based in Tokyo. The magazine targeted male students and featured historical heros and adventure novels. It frequently covered literary work about Japan’s victory in the Russo-Japanese War as well as about fantastic adventures around the world.

Shunro Oshikawa was the founding editor-in-chief of Bōken sekai. He was replaced by Tenpu Abe in the post in 1911, and Abe's term ended in 1917. The magazine ceased publication in 1920.

References

1908 establishments in Japan
1920 disestablishments in Japan
Defunct literary magazines published in Japan
History magazines
Magazines established in 1908
Magazines disestablished in 1920
Magazines published in Tokyo
Youth magazines